A by-election was held in the UK House of Commons constituency of Cork City on 25 May 1876 due to the death of Joseph Philip Ronayne, one of the two incumbent Home Rule League MPs, on 7 May 1876. It was won by the Conservative candidate William Goulding because the Home Rule vote was split between two candidates. It was the last time that a parliamentary election for Cork City was won by a Conservative or Unionist.

References

Elections in Cork (city)
By-elections to the Parliament of the United Kingdom in County Cork constituencies
1876 elections in the United Kingdom
1876 elections in Ireland